Yann Moix (born 31 March 1968) is a French author, film director and television presenter. He is the author of ten novels and the recipient of several literary prizes. He has directed three films. He was a columnist on On n'est pas couché.

Early life
Yann Moix was born on 31 March 1968 in Nevers, France. He earned a bachelor's degree in Philosophy from the University of Reims Champagne-Ardenne and graduated from the École supérieure de commerce de Reims. He subsequently graduated from Sciences Po.

Career
Moix is the author of several novels. He won the Prix Goncourt du premier roman, as well as the Prix François Mauriac from the Académie Française, for Jubilations vers le ciel in 1996. In 2013, he won the Prix Renaudot for Naissance.

Moix has directed three films, including Podium, which is based on one of his novels. Between 2015 and 2018, Moix was a panellist on On n'est pas couché, a television program. He also writes for the magazine La Règle du Jeu.<ref>Yann Moix, passé de Soral-Dieudonné-Blanrue à BHL, Cinquième Colonne, 27 novembre 2015.</ref>

Controversies
In 2009, Moix signed a petition in support of film director Roman Polanski, calling for his release after Polanski was arrested in Switzerland in relation to his 1977 charge for drugging and raping a 13-year-old girl.

In 2010, Moix signed a petition against the Gayssot Act created by his friend and Holocaust denier Paul-Éric Blanrue, stating that Robert Faurisson and Serge Thion were "serious, intelligent, though delirious revisionists". 

In January 2019, Moix's comments about women over the age of 50 caused outrage on social media in France. In an interview with the French edition of the women's magazine Marie Claire, Moix declared that women in their 50s were “invisible” to him and that he preferred "younger women's bodies." He added that he preferred dating Asian women, particularly if they are Korean, Chinese or Japanese.

In August 2019, his novel Orléans was published to critical acclaim, but it left critics and the public bewildered about the revelations it contained. The book, despite being presented as a novel, is made to look heavily autobiographical, which lead the public to think that Yann Moix actually endured as a young boy what the protagonist goes through. The book is laced with hate for the narrator's parents, with Moix positioning himself between the lines as a real-life long-suffering victim who finally dares to tell the truth. Following public protests by Moix's parents and younger brother, it was revealed that some of the severe incidents described in the book actually took place between him and his brother, who is not mentioned in the book, with Yann Moix as the tormentor, and that several of the situations depicted were in fact made up or "heavily exaggerated". His brother, Alexandre Moix, who is also a writer and film producer and whose first book Yann Moix had apparently tried to block the publication of on the grounds that "there can only be one Moix, MOI!" [him], told media that his elder brother "prefers to serve his own ambition rather than the truth". He also stated that his older brother should not be a flag-bearer for suffering children, since "he doesn't care about other people's suffering".

Right in the middle of this controversy, the French magazine L'Express revealed on 26 August 2019 that Yann Moix, who has always positioned himself as a staunch defender of the Jewish cause and of ill-treated minorities as a whole, contributed to a negationist, anti-semitic self-styled magazine while he was a student. At first, Moix admitted having drawn the images it contained, but strongly denied having written any of the offensive text, saying that he had merely copied what his fellow editors had composed "since his handwriting was the best of the lot". The following day, L'Express unearthed a document in which the same texts appear, presumably drafts for the magazine, signed by Yann Moix himself, including a short story about a Jew trying to bargain the price of his train ticket to Buchenwald. Moix relented, admitting that he wrote the texts and saying that today they make him "want to puke"; he also stated that he was never anti-semitic, just filled with hate for himself, and that all his life as a grown man he had worked hard to run away from "these toxic geographies". He claimed that he felt "liberated" now that the story had come out.

Works
Novels

Biography

Poetry collection

Documentary
 Moix, Yann (2017). Re-Calais''.

References

External links

Living people
1968 births
People from Nevers
University of Reims Champagne-Ardenne alumni
Sciences Po alumni
French male novelists
20th-century French novelists
21st-century French novelists
French male poets
21st-century French poets
21st-century French male writers
French biographers
Prix Goncourt du Premier Roman recipients
Prix Renaudot winners
20th-century French male writers
French male non-fiction writers
Male biographers